Lived to Tell is an album by the American alternative rock band Eleventh Dream Day, released in 1991. Like the band's other two Atlantic Records albums, Lived to Tell was a commercial disappointment.

Production
Produced by Paul McKenna, the album was recorded in Cub Run, Kentucky, in a studio that had been built in an old barn. All four band members contributed to the songwriting.

Critical reception

Entertainment Weekly wrote that the band "sport a wild instrumental attack, oblique lyrics, and a sturdy, unflinching belief in the healing effects of a silky, soaring guitar." Robert Christgau thought that "a notable guitar sound evolves into an undeniable band sound, roots/trad sonics (steel and slide under lead) and rhythms (buried hints of r&b strut and shuffle) just barely keeping their balance." Trouser Press opined that some songs "waver instead of stampede; for the first time, the band seems to know where they’re going, and that takes some joy out of the ride." 

The New York Times wrote: "When the tempos are fast and the guitarists strum at top speed, the songs emerge in a passionate rush. But when songs grow more leisurely, collegiate pretensions emerge; songs called 'Daedalus' and 'It's All a Game' are just the clichés their titles promise." The Chicago Tribune deemed Lived to Tell "an album that ranks as one of the best ever made by a Chicago band."

AllMusic wrote that "[Rick] Rizzo and Beveridge Bean make a fantastic pair of front singers, strong without being overbearing, on joint harmonies hitting something not far off from the brilliant combination of X's John Doe and Exene Cervenka."

Track listing

Personnel
Janet Beveridge Bean - drums, vocals
Baird Figi - guitar
Douglas McCombs - bass
Rick Rizzo - guitar, vocals

References

Eleventh Dream Day albums
1991 albums
Atlantic Records albums